Biseni may be,

Biseni Forest
Biseni language